Paleacrita merriccata, the white-spotted cankerworm moth, is a moth of the family Geometridae. The species was first described by Harrison Gray Dyar Jr. in 1903. It is found in eastern North America, where it has been recorded from central Illinois, eastern Missouri, west-central Mississippi, Louisiana and eastern Texas.

The length of the forewings is 14–18 mm for males. The females are wingless. Adults are similar to Paleacrita vernata, but less variable in maculation. There is a white discal dot white, narrowly outlined in dark grayish brown and there is a dark costal dash. The cubital vein is variably dark scaled. The hindwings are similar to those of P. vernata. Adult males are on wing in March, April and May in the north and January and February in the south.

References

External links
 

Moths described in 1903
Bistonini